The 2011 Oceanian Futsal Championship (OFC) was the eighth edition of the main international futsal tournament of the Oceanian region. It took place from May 16 to May 20, 2011, and was hosted by Fiji, which had also hosted three previous editions.

The number of participating nations rose to eight, up from seven in 2010, as Kiribati made their first ever appearance at the OFC Futsal Championship.

The defending champions, the Solomon Islands, retained their title, defeating Tahiti by six goals to four in the final.

The tournament's Golden Ball (Player of the tournament) award went to Elliot Ragomo of the Solomon Islands, who also won Golden Boot award for the highest number of goals scored in the tournament.

The tournament also acted as a qualifying tournament for the 2012 FIFA Futsal World Cup in Thailand. The Solomon Islands won the tournament, and qualified for the World Cup.

Championship

Group A

Group B

7th place match

5th place match

Semi-finals

Third place play-off

Final

References

OFC Futsal Championship
2011 in futsal
2012 FIFA Futsal World Cup
Futsal
2011